The 1000 yen coin is a denomination of the Japanese yen. This denomination is only used for the issue of commemorative silver coins struck by the Japan Mint.

History
The first 1000 yen coin was issued in 1964 to commemorate the Tokyo Olympics. Since then, the Japan Mint has issued various 1000 yen coins commemorating various subjects and events of Japan's history. The recent 1000 yen commemorative coins now have color applied to parts of the coin's design.

List of commemoratives

Early issues (1964–2007)

47 Prefectures Coin Program (2008–2016)

Starting in 2008, a program similar to the American 50 State Quarters was put into place which honors all 47 of Japan's prefectures. This was done by celebrating the 60th Anniversary of Enforcement of the Local Autonomy Law in the form of 47 different commemorative coins (designs on obverse side). The program ran until 2016, concluding with the final issues for Tokyo and Fukushima. All 1,000 yen coins were minted in silver, and have a fixed mintage of 100,000 per issue. The Japanese dates used for the coins appears in Arabic numerals to reflect former emperor Akihito's (Heisei) year of reign. Many of the designs are cultural in nature and depict elements such as shrines, flora/fauna, and historical figures.

Commemoratives  (2012–present)
The following include commemorative issues that were released concurrently with the 47 Prefectures Coin Program, as well as those released up to present. Seven issues ran concurrently with the program, including a series that was launched in 2015 as a response to the 2011 Great East Japan earthquake and tsunami. Later issues include coins being released for the 2020 Summer Olympics in Tokyo.

Notes

References

External links
Commemorative coins issued - Japan Mint website (In English)

Japanese yen coins
Commemorative coins of Japan